The Francqui Foundation was founded in 1932 by Emile Francqui and Herbert Hoover with the goal "to further the development of higher education and scientific research in Belgium". The foundation is a private foundation under the legal form of a Belgian Fondation of Public Utility. The Francqui Foundation wants to encourage the prestige of disinterested fundamental research.

Francqui Prize
In 1933, the Francqui Prize was awarded for the first time. This prize is intended for those Belgians who have made an important contribution to science and thereby to Belgium. Henri Pirenne, Christian de Duve, and Ilya Prigogine are among those who have received this prize.

Francqui Chairs
A Belgian or non-Belgian scientist can be invited by the Francqui Foundation for a stay at a Belgian university. The scientist should participate in the scientific life and provide a specialized teaching. The proposal for the invitation is made by two or more Belgian universities.

See also
 Academia Belgica
 Belgian Academy Council of Applied Sciences
 Belgian American Educational Foundation (BAEF)
 National Fund for Scientific Research
 Science and technology in Belgium
 The Royal Academies for Science and the Arts of Belgium
 University Foundation

External links
 Francqui Foundation

Scientific organisations based in Belgium
Foundations based in Belgium
Science and technology in Belgium